The Bzhedug dialect is a dialect of Adyghe. The Bzhedug dialect is spoken by the Bzhedugs who live mostly in Adygea and Biga.

Phonology

Dropped consonants 
In the Bzhedug dialect (as in the Northern Shapsug dialect) in some cases the consonants н , м  and р  are dropped and are not pronounced.

 The consonant м  is dropped before bilabial stops б , п , пI  :

 The consonant н  is dropped before postalveolar affricates дж , ч , кI  and before alveolar stops д , т , тI  :

Aspirated consonants
In the Bzhedug dialect (Like the Shapsug dialect) there exist a series of aspirated consonants (/pʰ/ /tʰ/ /ʃʰ/ /t͡sʰ/ /t͡ʃʰ/ /t͡ʂʰ/ /t͡ɕʰʷ/ /kʰʷ/ /qʰ/ /qʰʷ/) that became plain consonants in other dialects :

 Bzhedug пʰ  ↔ п  in other dialects :

 Bzhedug тʰ  ↔ т  in other dialects :

 Bzhedug цʰ  ↔ ц  in other dialects :

 Bzhedug шʰ  ↔ щ  in other Adyghe dialects :

 Bzhedug чʰ  ↔ ч  in other dialects (кь  in Shapsug) :

 Bzhedug кʰу  ↔ ку  in other dialects :

 Bzhedug къʰ  ↔ къ  in other Adyghe dialects (хъ  in Shapsug) :

 Bzhedug къуʰ  ↔ къу  in other Adyghe dialects (хъу  in Shapsug) :

 Bzhedug чъʰу  ↔ цу  in Temirgoy:

 The consonant х [х] becomes к [k] after ш [ʃ] in Bzhedug:

Grammar differences

Noun instrumental case 

In the instrumental case the noun has the suffix мджэ (-md͡ʒa) or -джэ (-d͡ʒa) unlike other dialects (e.g. Abzakh, Temirgoy and Standard Kabardian) that has the suffix -мкIэ (-mt͡ʃʼa) or -кIэ (-t͡ʃʼa) :

 Bzhedug dialect: КIалэр Адыгэбзэджэ мэгущаIэ ↔ Standard: КIалэр АдыгэбзэкIэ мэгущыIэ - "The boy speaks (using) Adyghe language".
 Bzhedug dialect: Къэлэмымджэ сэтхэ ↔ Standard: КъэлэмымкIэ сэтхэ - "I write (using) with the pencil".

Future tense Suffix ~т (~t)
In this dialect the future tense suffix is ~эт (~at) and in some cases ~ыт (~ət) unlike standard Adyghe (Temirgoy) that has the Suffix ~щт (~ɕt).

Location

Unique words

Sample text

See also
 Hakuchi Adyghe dialect
 Kfar Kama Adyghe dialect
 Shapsug Adyghe dialect
 Abzakh Adyghe dialect
 Baslaney dialect

External links 
 A song in Bzhedug dialect (Emizh Nurbi - Come Home in peace)
 A song in Bzhedug dialect (Emizh Nurbi - I want you)

References 

Adyghe language